Alen Mešanović (born October 26, 1975) is a former Bosnian international footballer.

International career
He made his debut for Bosnia and Herzegovina in a November 1997 friendly match away against Tunisia and has earned a total of 2 caps, scoring no goals. His second and final international was a March 2000 friendly against Jordan.

Honours

Player

Club
Sarajevo 
Bosnian Cup: 2001–02

Željezničar Sarajevo 
Bosnian Premier League: 2009–10

References

External links
 

1975 births
Living people
People from Bihać
Association football forwards
Bosnia and Herzegovina footballers
Bosnia and Herzegovina international footballers
FK Velež Mostar players
FK Radnik Bijeljina players
NK Jedinstvo Bihać players
FK Sarajevo players
FK Sloboda Tuzla players
NK Čelik Zenica players
HŠK Posušje players
FK Željezničar Sarajevo players
NK Hrvatski Dragovoljac players
Premier League of Bosnia and Herzegovina players
First League of the Federation of Bosnia and Herzegovina players
Croatian Football League players
Bosnia and Herzegovina expatriate footballers
Expatriate footballers in Croatia
Bosnia and Herzegovina expatriate sportspeople in Croatia
Bosnia and Herzegovina football managers